Gvozdanović is a surname. Notable people with the surname include:

 Petar Vid Gvozdanović (1738–1802), Croatian Habsburg general and nobleman
 Karlo Pavao Gvozdanović (1763–1817), Croatian Habsburg general and nobleman

See also
 Gvozdenović